The 1974–75 SK Rapid Wien season was the 77th season in club history.

Squad

Squad and statistics

Squad statistics

Fixtures and results

League

Cup

UEFA Cup

References

1974-75 Rapid Wien Season
Rapid